General Thomas may refer to:

United Kingdom
Sir Godfrey Thomas, 9th Baronet (1856–1919), British brigadier general
Ivor Thomas (British Army officer) (1893–1972), British general
Jerry Thomas (Royal Marines officer) (fl. 1970s–2010s), Royal Marines major general
John Wellesley Thomas (1822–1908), British lieutenant general
Lechmere Thomas (1897–1981), British major general
Noel Thomas (1915–1983), British general
Owen Thomas (politician) (1858–1923), British Army brigadier general
Walter Babington Thomas (1919–2017), British major general

United States
Allen Thomas (1830–1907), Confederate States Army general
Arthur S. Thomas (1935–2001), U.S. Air Force general
Bryan M. Thomas (1836–1905), Confederate States Army general
Charles Thomas (1797–1878), U.S. brevet major general in the American Civil War
Charles W. Thomas (general), U.S. Army general
Edward Lloyd Thomas (1825–1898), Confederate States Army general
Edward W. Thomas (fl. 1990s–2020s), U.S. Air Force major general
Gary L. Thomas (general) (born 1962), U.S. Marine Corps four-star general.
George Henry Thomas (1816–1870), U.S. or Union Army general
Gerald C. Thomas (1894–1984), U.S. Marine Corps general
Henry Goddard Thomas (1837–1897), Union Army general
James Thomas (Governor of Maryland) (1785–1845), U.S. brevet major general in the War of 1812
Jett Thomas (1776–1817), Georgia State Militia major general
John Thomas (American general) (1724–1776), American Revolutionary War general
Jon T. Thomas (born 1967) U.S. Air Force lieutenant general
Lawrence S. Thomas III (fl. 1970s–2000s), U.S. Air Force general
Lorenzo Thomas (1804–1875), U.S. Army general
Randal E. Thomas, retired U.S. Army general
Raymond A. Thomas (born 1958), U.S. Army general
Samuel Russell Thomas (1840–1903), Union Army general 
Stephen Thomas (Medal of Honor) (1809–1903), Union Army general

Other
Georg Thomas (1890–1946), German general
Wilhelm Thomas (1892–1976), German general

See also
 Thomas (surname)
Attorney General Thomas (disambiguation)